This is a list of Spanish football transfers for the winter 2021–22 sale in the La Liga and Segunda División.

The Spanish winter transfer window opened on 2 January 2022, although a few transfers were announced prior to that date. The window closed at midnight on 31 January 2022. Players without a club can join one at any time, either during or in between transfer windows. Clubs below La Liga level can also sign players on loan at any time. If need be, clubs can sign a goalkeeper on an emergency loan, if all others are unavailable.

Winter 2021–22 La Liga transfer window

References

Transfers
Spain
2021-22